This is a list of radio stations that broadcast on FM frequency 96.2 MHz:

Belarus
 Melodii Veka

China
 CNR Business Radio in Liupanshui
 CNR Music Radio in Liupanshui

Greece
 Argos Radio Deejay

Ireland
 Radio Kerry

Latvia
EHR Russkie Hiti in Riga

Malaysia
 Terengganu FM in Northern Terengganu

New Zealand
 Classic Hits Southern Lakes (Wanaka frequency)
 Coromandel FM (Thames Coast frequency)
 Solid Gold (Gisborne frequency)

United Kingdom
 Heart West
 KMFM West Kent (Tonbridge frequency)
 Greatest Hits Radio Bucks, Beds and Herts
 Greatest Hits Radio Norfolk & North Suffolk
 Heart North East (Newcastle frequency)
 Greatest Hits Radio Manchester
 SIBC
 Capital Mid-Counties
 Capital Midlands (Nottingham frequency)
 Greatest Hits Radio Yorkshire Coast (Scarborough frequency)

Vietnam
Tien Giang Radio, in Tien Giang province

References

Lists of radio stations by frequency